Martin Smith (born January 14, 1968) is a Canadian former competitive ice dancer. With Jo-Anne Borlase, he is the 1989 NHK Trophy bronze medalist, 1989 Skate America bronze medalist, and 1990 Canadian national champion. With Michelle McDonald, he won the 1991 Canadian national title.

Career 
Early in his career, Smith skated in partnership with Melanie Cole. The two placed fourth at the 1986 World Junior Championships, which took place in December 1985 in Sarajevo, and won the Canadian national junior title the same season. The following season, they competed on the senior level, placing 8th at the 1986 Skate America.

In 1987, Smith teamed up with Jo-Anne Borlase. In their second season together, they won bronze at the Canadian Championships. In their third, they took bronze at the 1989 Skate America and 1989 NHK Trophy before winning the national title. They finished 7th at their final event together, the 1990 World Championships in Halifax, Nova Scotia.

Smith competed the next two seasons with Michelle McDonald. The two won the 1991 Canadian national title but dropped to third in 1992 and missed out on the Olympics.

Smith represented the Kitchener-Waterloo Skating Club (1986) and the Granite Club (1990 to 1992).

Competitive highlights

With McDonald

With Borlase

With Cole

References 

Living people
Canadian male ice dancers
1968 births
20th-century Canadian people